Florence Elizabeth Castle (1867–1959) was a British artist, known as a painter and illustrator.

Biography
Castle was born in Croydon where her father was based as a commercial traveller and, after attending Croydon High School, she studied at the Lambeth School of Art where she was taught by Sir William Llewellyn. After further study in Paris, Castle returned to London where she lived for the rest of her life and had a studio in West Kensington. During her career she painted portraits, still life pieces and landscapes in oils and pastels and also created illustrations. Castle exhibited works at the Royal Academy in London from 1892 onwards, with the Royal Institute of Oil Painters, the New English Art Club and, from 1905 to 1950, with the Society of Women Artists. She also exhibited with, and was elected a member of, The Pastel Society.

References

1867 births
1959 deaths
19th-century English painters
19th-century English women artists
20th-century English painters
20th-century English women artists
Alumni of the Lambeth School of Art
Artists from London
English illustrators
English women painters
People educated at Croydon High School
People from Croydon